The following is a partial list of the "D" codes for Medical Subject Headings (MeSH), as defined by the United States National Library of Medicine (NLM).

This list continues the information at List of MeSH codes (D02). Codes following these are found at List of MeSH codes (D04). For other MeSH codes, see List of MeSH codes.

The source for this content is the set of 2006 MeSH Trees from the NLM.

– heterocyclic compounds

– acids, heterocyclic

– cinoxacin

– indoleacetic acids
  – etodolac
  – hydroxyindoleacetic acid

– isonicotinic acids
  – ethionamide
  – iproniazid
  – isoniazid
  – nialamide
  – prothionamide
  – pyridoxic acid

– isonipecotic acids
  – diphenoxylate
  – meperidine
  – promedol
  – phenoperidine
  – pirinitramide

– nicotinic acids
  – arecoline
  – clonixin
  – etazolate
  – niacin
  – niacinamide
  – 6-aminonicotinamide
  – nicorandil
  – nikethamide
  – niceritrol
  – niflumic acid
  – pipemidic acid
  – piromidic acid
  – xanthinol niacinate

– nipecotic acids

– orotic acid

– picolinic acids
  – fusaric acid
  – picloram
  – streptonigrin

– pipecolic acids

– xanthurenates
  – kynurenic acid

– alkaloids

– aconitine

– acronine

– amaryllidaceae alkaloids
  – galantamine

– aporphines
  – apomorphine

– arecoline

– berberine alkaloids
  – berberine

– bicuculline

– camptothecin
  – topotecan

– cinchona alkaloids
  – quinidine
  – quinine

– colchicine
  – demecolcine
  – lumicolchicines

– dihydro-beta-erythroidine

– emetine

– ergot alkaloids
  – ergolines
  – ergonovine
  – methylergonovine
  – lisuride
  – lysergic acid
  – lysergic acid diethylamide
  – metergoline
  – methysergide
  – nicergoline
  – pergolide
  – ergotamines
  – bromocriptine
  – dihydroergocornine
  – dihydroergocristine
  – dihydroergocryptine
  – dihydroergotamine
  – dihydroergotoxine
  – ergoloid mesylates
  – ergotamine

– harringtonines

– indole alkaloids
  – curare
  – toxiferine
  – alcuronium
  – tubocurarine
  – harmaline
  – harmine
  – physostigmine
  – psilocybine
  – secologanin tryptamine alkaloids
  – ajmaline
  – prajmaline
  – ellipticines
  – ibogaine
  – strychnine
  – vinca alkaloids
  – vinblastine
  – vincamine
  – vincristine
  – vindesine
  – yohimbine
  – reserpine
  – staurosporine

– lobeline

– mescaline

– muscarine

– opium
  – morphinans
  – benzomorphans
  – pentazocine
  – phenazocine
  – buprenorphine
  – butorphanol
  – dextrorphan
  – diprenorphine
  – etorphine
  – levallorphan
  – levorphanol
  – dextromethorphan
  – morphine
  – morphine derivatives
  – codeine
  – hydrocodone
  – oxycodone
  – dihydromorphine
  – ethylmorphine
  – heroin
  – hydromorphone
  – oxymorphone
  – thebaine
  – nalbuphine
  – nalorphine
  – naloxone
  – naltrexone
  – noscapine
  – papaverine
  – tetrahydropapaveroline

– pilocarpine

– pyrrolizidine alkaloids
  – monocrotaline

– ryanodine

– salsoline alkaloids

– solanaceous alkaloids
  – belladonna alkaloids
  – atropine
  – scopolamine
  – capsaicin
  – nicotine
  – solanine
  – tomatine

– sparteine

– swainsonine

– tropanes
  – belladonna alkaloids
  – atropine
  – atropine derivatives
  – ipratropium
  – benztropine
  – cocaine
  – crack cocaine
  – scopolamine
  – scopolamine derivatives
  – butylscopolammonium bromide
  – n-methylscopolamine

– veratrum alkaloids
  – cevanes
  – germine acetates
  – protoveratrines
  – veratrine
  – veratridine

– heterocyclic compounds, 1-ring

– azepines
  – caprolactam
  – dilazep
  – meptazinol
  – oxazepines
  – pentylenetetrazole
  – thiazepines
  – zolazepam

– azetines
  – azetidines
  – azetidinecarboxylic acid

– azirines
  – aziridines
  – carbazilquinone
  – triaziquone
  – triethylenemelamine
  – triethylenephosphoramide
  – thiotepa
  – mitomycins
  – mitomycin
  – porfiromycin

– azocines
  – cyclazocine
  – ethylketocyclazocine
  – oxazocines
  – nefopam

– azoles
  – imidazoles
  – aminoimidazole carboxamide
  – antazoline
  – biotin
  – bis(4-methyl-1-homopiperazinylthiocarbonyl)disulfide
  – 4-(3-butoxy-4-methoxybenzyl)-2-imidazolidinone
  – carbimazole
  – cimetidine
  – clotrimazole
  – creatinine
  – dacarbazine
  – dexmedetomidine
  – econazole
  – enoximone
  – etimizol
  – etomidate
  – fadrozole
  – fluspirilene
  – histamine
  – methylhistamines
  – histidinol
  – hydantoins
  – allantoin
  – dantrolene
  – mephenytoin
  – phenytoin
  – thiohydantoins
  – phenylthiohydantoin
  – idazoxan
  – imidazolidines
  – ethylenethiourea
  – imidazolines
  – clonidine
  – tolazoline
  – impromidine
  – levamisole
  – losartan
  – medetomidine
  – methimazole
  – miconazole
  – naphazoline
  – niridazole
  – nitroimidazoles
  – dimetridazole
  – etanidazole
  – ipronidazole
  – metronidazole
  – misonidazole
  – nimorazole
  – ornidazole
  – ronidazole
  – tinidazole
  – ondansetron
  – oxymetazoline
  – phentolamine
  – tetramisole
  – trimethaphan
  – urocanic acid
  – isoxazoles
  – alpha-amino-3-hydroxy-5-methyl-4-isoxazolepropionic acid
  – cycloserine
  – ibotenic acid
  – isocarboxazid
  – oxazoles
  – aminorex
  – dimethadione
  – fura-2
  – muscimol
  – oxadiazoles
  – 5-amino-3-((5-nitro-2-furyl)vinyl)-1,2,4-oxadiazole
  – 4-chloro-7-nitrobenzofurazan
  – quisqualic acid
  – sydnones
  – molsidomine
  – oxazolidinones
  – cycloserine
  – furazolidone
  – nifuratel
  – oxazolone
  – pemoline
  – trimethadione
  – pyrazoles
  – betazole
  – 4,5-dihydro-1-(3-(trifluoromethyl)phenyl)-1h-pyrazol-3-amine
  – epirizole
  – indazoles
  – benzydamine
  – granisetron
  – muzolimine
  – oxypurinol
  – pyrazolones
  – aminopyrine
  – ampyrone
  – dipyrone (metamizole)
  – antipyrine
  – phenylbutazone
  – oxyphenbutazone
  – prenazone
  – sulfinpyrazone
  – pyrroles
  – cromakalim
  – maleimides
  – ethylmaleimide
  – porphobilinogen
  – prodigiosin
  – pyrrolnitrin
  – tetrapyrroles
  – bile pigments
  – bilirubin
  – biliverdine
  – urobilin
  – urobilinogen
  – chlorophyll
  – bacteriochlorophylls
  – chlorophyllides
  – pheophytins
  – protochlorophyllide
  – corrinoids
  – vitamin b 12
  – cobamides
  – hydroxocobalamin
  – porphyrins
  – coproporphyrins
  – deuteroporphyrins
  – etioporphyrins
  – hematoporphyrins
  – hematoporphyrin derivative
  – dihematoporphyrin ether
  – mesoporphyrins
  – metalloporphyrins
  – chlorophyll
  – bacteriochlorophylls
  – chlorophyllides
  – protochlorophyllide
  – heme
  – hemin
  – porphyrinogens
  – coproporphyrinogens
  – uroporphyrinogens
  – protoporphyrins
  – uroporphyrins
  – tolmetin
  – tetrazoles
  – cefotetan
  – losartan
  – tetrazolium salts
  – nitroblue tetrazolium
  – thiazoles
  – benzothiazoles
  – dithiazanine
  – ethoxzolamide
  – riluzole
  – saccharin
  – thiabendazole
  – chlormethiazole
  – famotidine
  – fanft
  – firefly luciferin
  – levamisole
  – niridazole
  – nizatidine
  – oxythiamine
  – rhodanine
  – ritonavir
  – sulfathiazoles
  – tetramisole
  – thiadiazoles
  – acetazolamide
  – benzolamide
  – methazolamide
  – timolol
  – thiamine
  – fursultiamin
  – thiamine monophosphate
  – thiamine pyrophosphate
  – thiamine triphosphate
  – thiazolidinediones
  – triazoles
  – amitrole
  – fluconazole
  – guanazole
  – itraconazole
  – trapidil

– dioxins
  – dioxanes
  – idazoxan
  – tetrachlorodibenzodioxin

– dioxoles
  – benzodioxoles
  – piperonyl butoxide
  – safrole
  – dioxolanes

– furans
  – 4-butyrolactone
  – citraconic anhydrides
  – furaldehyde
  – lasalocid
  – maleic anhydrides
  – monensin
  – nafronyl
  – nigericin
  – nitrofurans
  – 5-amino-3-((5-nitro-2-furyl)vinyl)-1,2,4-oxadiazole
  – fanft
  – furagin
  – furazolidone
  – furylfuramide
  – nifuratel
  – nifurtimox
  – nitrofurantoin
  – nitrofurazone
  – nitrovin
  – psoralens
  – ficusin
  – khellin
  – methoxsalen
  – trioxsalen
  – ranitidine

– lactams
  – caprolactam
  – monobactams
  – aztreonam
  – moxalactam

– oxathiins
  – carboxin

– oxazines
  – benzoxazines
  – ifosfamide
  – morpholines
  – dextromoramide
  – molsidomine
  – moricizine
  – phenmetrazine
  – timolol
  – viloxazine
  – xamoterol

– oxepins

– oxocins

– piperazines
  – almitrine
  – cinnarizine
  – cyclizine
  – delavirdine
  – diethylcarbamazine
  – dimethylphenylpiperazinium iodide
  – flunarizine
  – flupenthixol
  – hepes
  – hydroxyzine
  – cetirizine
  – 1-(5-isoquinolinesulfonyl)-2-methylpiperazine
  – itraconazole
  – ketoconazole
  – lidoflazine
  – meclizine
  – pipecuronium
  – pipemidic acid
  – pipobroman
  – piribedil
  – prospidium
  – quipazine
  – razoxane
  – thiethylperazine
  – trazodone
  – trimetazidine

– piperidines
  – alphaprodine
  – anabasine
  – betalains
  – betacyanins
  – betaxanthins
  – biperiden
  – cisapride
  – clopamide
  – cyproheptadine
  – loratadine
  – 1-deoxynojirimycin
  – domperidone
  – fentanyl
  – alfentanil
  – sufentanil
  – flecainide
  – fluspirilene
  – imino pyranoses
  – indoramin
  – isonipecotic acids
  – diphenoxylate
  – meperidine
  – promedol
  – phenoperidine
  – pirinitramide
  – ketanserin
  – ketotifen
  – lobeline
  – loperamide
  – mepivacaine
  – methylphenidate
  – minoxidil
  – nipecotic acids
  – paroxetine
  – pempidine
  – penfluridol
  – perhexiline
  – phencyclidine
  – pipecolic acids
  – bupivacaine
  – piperidones
  – cycloheximide
  – dexetimide
  – glutethimide
  – aminoglutethimide
  – thalidomide
  – triacetoneamine-n-oxyl
  – piperoxan
  – ritanserin
  – terfenadine
  – trihexyphenidyl

– pyrans
  – aurovertins
  – iridoids
  – nigericin
  – pyran copolymer
  – pyrones

– pyrazines
  – amiloride
  – pyrazinamide

– pyridazines
  – cilazapril
  – luminol
  – maleic hydrazide
  – phthalazines
  – hydralazine
  – dihydralazine
  – todralazine

– pyridines
  – aminopyridines
  – 4-aminopyridine
  – amrinone
  – milrinone
  – methapyrilene
  – phenazopyridine
  – pyrilamine
  – tripelennamine
  – betahistine
  – carbolines
  – clopidol
  – dihydropyridines
  – amlodipine
  – dicarbethoxydihydrocollidine
  – felodipine
  – isradipine
  – nicardipine
  – nifedipine
  – nimodipine
  – nisoldipine
  – nitrendipine
  – 3-pyridinecarboxylic acid, 1,4-dihydro-2,6-dimethyl-5-nitro-4-(2-(trifluoromethyl)phenyl)-, methyl ester
  – dimethindene
  – 2,2'-dipyridyl
  – disopyramide
  – doxylamine
  – indinavir
  – isonicotinic acids
  – ethionamide
  – iproniazid
  – isoniazid
  – nialamide
  – prothionamide
  – pyridoxic acid
  – 1-methyl-4-phenyl-1,2,3,6-tetrahydropyridine
  – metyrapone
  – naphthylvinylpyridine
  – nevirapine
  – nicotine
  – nicotinic acids
  – arecoline
  – clonixin
  – etazolate
  – niacin
  – niacinamide
  – 6-aminonicotinamide
  – nicorandil
  – nikethamide
  – niceritrol
  – niflumic acid
  – nimodipine
  – pipemidic acid
  – piromidic acid
  – 3-pyridinecarboxylic acid, 1,4-dihydro-2,6-dimethyl-5-nitro-4-(2-(trifluoromethyl)phenyl)-, methyl ester
  – xanthinol niacinate
  – nicotinyl alcohol
  – omeprazole
  – pheniramine
  – brompheniramine
  – zimeldine
  – chlorpheniramine
  – picolines
  – amprolium
  – vitamin b 6
  – pyridoxal
  – pyridoxal phosphate
  – pyridoxamine
  – pyridoxine
  – picolinic acids
  – fusaric acid
  – picloram
  – pyridoxic acid
  – streptonigrin
  – polyvinylpyridine n-oxide
  – pyridinium compounds
  – cetylpyridinium
  – desmosine
  – diquat
  – isodesmosine
  – 1-methyl-4-phenylpyridinium
  – obidoxime chloride
  – paraquat
  – pyridostigmine bromide
  – pyrithiamine
  – trimedoxime
  – viologens
  – benzyl viologen
  – pyridones
  – bemegride
  – iodopyridones
  – iodopyracet
  – propyliodone
  – mimosine
  – trazodone
  – pyrithioxin
  – quinolinic acids
  – quinolinic acid
  – tolperisone
  – triprolidine
  – tropicamide

– pyrimidines
  – buspirone
  – dipyridamole
  – epirizole
  – fursultiamin
  – hexetidine
  – minoxidil
  – mopidamol
  – morantel
  – nicarbazin
  – oxypurinol
  – pyrantel
  – pyrantel pamoate
  – pyrantel tartrate
  – pyrimethamine
  – pyrimidinones
  – alloxan
  – barbiturates
  – amobarbital
  – barbital
  – hexobarbital
  – mephobarbital
  – methohexital
  – murexide
  – pentobarbital
  – phenobarbital
  – primidone
  – secobarbital
  – thiobarbiturates
  – thiamylal
  – thiopental
  – cytosine
  – flucytosine
  – 5-methylcytosine
  – risperidone
  – ritanserin
  – sparsomycin
  – uracil
  – bromouracil
  – fluorouracil
  – tegafur
  – hydroxyphenylazouracil
  – orotic acid
  – pentoxyl
  – thiouracil
  – methylthiouracil
  – propylthiouracil
  – thymine
  – uracil mustard
  – pyrithiamine
  – thiamine
  – fursultiamin
  – thiamine monophosphate
  – thiamine pyrophosphate
  – thiamine triphosphate
  – trapidil
  – trimethoprim
  – trimethoprim-sulfamethoxazole combination

– pyrrolidines
  – anisomycin
  – bepridil
  – clemastine
  – 3,4-dichloro-n-methyl-n-(2-(1-pyrrolidinyl)-cyclohexyl)-benzeneacetamide, (trans)-isomer
  – glycopyrrolate
  – imino furanoses
  – kainic acid
  – lincomycin
  – clindamycin
  – nafoxidine
  – nitromifene
  – n-nitrosopyrrolidine
  – pentolinium tartrate
  – procyclidine
  – pyrrolidinones
  – cotinine
  – doxapram
  – oxotremorine
  – piracetam
  – povidone
  – povidone-iodine
  – pyrrolidonecarboxylic acid
  – rolipram
  – succinimides
  – bromosuccinimide
  – ethosuximide
  – tenuazonic acid
  – tremorine

– thiazines
  – chlormezanone
  – nifurtimox
  – piroxicam
  – thiadiazines
  – xylazine

– thiepins
  – thiazepines

– thiophenes
  – carticaine
  – ketotifen
  – morantel
  – pizotyline
  – pyrantel
  – pyrantel pamoate
  – pyrantel tartrate
  – thenoyltrifluoroacetone
  – ticlopidine
  – ticrynafen
  – tiletamine

– triazines
  – almitrine
  – altretamine
  – apazone
  – atrazine
  – ferrozine
  – oxonic acid
  – prometryne
  – simazine
  – triethylenemelamine

– heterocyclic compounds, 2-ring

– benzazepines
  – benzodiazepines
  – alprazolam
  – benzodiazepinones
  – anthramycin
  – bromazepam
  – clonazepam
  – devazepide
  – diazepam
  – nordazepam
  – flumazenil
  – flunitrazepam
  – flurazepam
  – lorazepam
  – nitrazepam
  – oxazepam
  – pirenzepine
  – prazepam
  – temazepam
  – chlordiazepoxide
  – clorazepate dipotassium
  – estazolam
  – medazepam
  – midazolam
  – triazolam
  – diltiazem
  – fenoldopam
  – galantamine
  – harringtonines
  – (r)-2,3,4,5-tetrahydro-8-chloro-3-methyl-5-phenyl-1h-3-benzazepin-7-ol
  – 2,3,4,5-tetrahydro-7,8-dihydroxy-1-phenyl-1h-3-benzazepine

– benzimidazoles
  – albendazole
  – astemizole
  – benomyl
  – bisbenzimide
  – cambendazole
  – domperidone
  – droperidol
  – fenbendazole
  – mebendazole
  – mibefradil
  – nocodazole
  – omeprazole
  – pimozide
  – thiabendazole

– benzodioxoles
  – piperonyl butoxide
  – safrole

– benzofurans
  – amiodarone
  – benzbromarone
  – cantharidin
  – citalopram
  – fura-2
  – griseofulvin
  – pterocarpans

– benzopyrans
  – aflatoxins
  – aflatoxin b1
  – aflatoxin m1
  – chromans
  – catechin
  – centchroman
  – chromones
  – cromolyn sodium
  – flavonoids
  – anthocyanins
  – benzoflavones
  – beta-naphthoflavone
  – biflavonoids
  – catechin
  – chalcones
  – chalcone
  – flavanones
  – hesperidin
  – flavones
  – apigenin
  – diosmin
  – flavoxate
  – luteolin
  – flavonolignans
  – silymarin
  – flavonols
  – kaempferols
  – quercetin
  – rutin
  – hydroxyethylrutoside
  – isoflavones
  – coumestrol
  – genistein
  – pterocarpans
  – rotenone
  – proanthocyanidins
  – citrinin
  – coumarins
  – aminocoumarins
  – novobiocin
  – chromonar
  – coumestrol
  – esculin
  – 4-hydroxycoumarins
  – acenocoumarol
  – dicumarol
  – ethyl biscoumacetate
  – phenprocoumon
  – warfarin
  – isocoumarins
  – ochratoxins
  – psoralens
  – ficusin
  – khellin
  – methoxsalen
  – trioxsalen
  – pyranocoumarins
  – umbelliferones
  – coumaphos
  – hymecromone
  – scopoletin
  – cromakalim
  – ellagic acid
  – hematoxylin
  – vitamin e
  – tocopherols
  – alpha-tocopherol
  – beta-tocopherol
  – gamma-tocopherol
  – tocotrienols

– benzothiadiazines
  – bendroflumethiazide
  – chlorothiazide
  – hydrochlorothiazide
  – trichlormethiazide
  – cyclopenthiazide
  – diazoxide
  – hydroflumethiazide
  – methyclothiazide
  – polythiazide

– benzothiazoles
  – dithiazanine
  – ethoxzolamide
  – riluzole
  – saccharin
  – thiabendazole

– benzothiepins
  – endosulfan

– benzoxazines

– benzoxazoles
  – calcimycin
  – chlorzoxazone
  – cialit
  – zoxazolamine

– benzoxepins

– bicyclo compounds, heterocyclic
  – penicillins
  – amdinocillin
  – amdinocillin pivoxil
  – cyclacillin
  – methicillin
  – nafcillin
  – oxacillin
  – cloxacillin
  – dicloxacillin
  – floxacillin
  – penicillanic acid
  – penicillin g
  – ampicillin
  – amoxicillin
  – amoxicillin-potassium clavulanate combination
  – azlocillin
  – mezlocillin
  – piperacillin
  – pivampicillin
  – talampicillin
  – carbenicillin
  – carfecillin
  – penicillin g, benzathine
  – penicillin g, procaine
  – sulbenicillin
  – penicillin v
  – sulbactam
  – ticarcillin

– indazoles
  – benzydamine
  – granisetron

– indoles
  – adrenochrome
  – alcian blue
  – captan
  – carbolines
  – chlorisondamine
  – cytochalasins
  – cytochalasin b
  – cytochalasin d
  – delavirdine
  – gliotoxin
  – hydroxytryptophol
  – ibogaine
  – indapamide
  – indican
  – indigotindisulfonate sodium
  – indocyanine green
  – indole alkaloids
  – curare
  – toxiferine
  – alcuronium
  – tubocurarine
  – harmaline
  – harmine
  – lyngbya toxins
  – physostigmine
  – psilocybine
  – secologanin tryptamine alkaloids
  – ajmaline
  – prajmaline
  – ellipticines
  – ibogaine
  – strychnine
  – vinca alkaloids
  – vinblastine
  – vincamine
  – vincristine
  – vindesine
  – yohimbine
  – reserpine
  – staurosporine
  – indoleacetic acids
  – etodolac
  – hydroxyindoleacetic acid
  – indolequinones
  – mitomycins
  – mitomycin
  – porfiromycin
  – pyrroloiminoquinones
  – indomethacin
  – ketorolac
  – ketorolac tromethamine
  – indoramin
  – iprindole
  – isatin
  – mazindol
  – methisazone
  – molindone
  – oxyphenisatin acetate
  – perindopril
  – skatole
  – sporidesmins
  – tryptamines
  – dihydroxytryptamines
  – 5,6-dihydroxytryptamine
  – 5,7-dihydroxytryptamine
  – N,N-Dimethyltryptamine
  – bufotenin
  – methoxydimethyltryptamines
  – melatonin
  – psilocybine
  – serotonin
  – bufotenin
  – methoxydimethyltryptamines
  – 5-methoxytryptamine
  – sumatriptan

– indolizines

– isoquinolines
  – benzylisoquinolines
  – atracurium
  – bicuculline
  – papaverine
  – tetrahydropapaveroline
  – tretoquinol
  – debrisoquin
  – emetine
  – 1-(5-isoquinolinesulfonyl)-2-methylpiperazine
  – nelfinavir
  – nomifensine
  – noscapine
  – praziquantel
  – saquinavir
  – tetrahydroisoquinolines
  – salsoline alkaloids

– naphthyridines
  – nalidixic acid

– pteridines
  – flavins
  – riboflavin
  – flavin-adenine dinucleotide
  – flavin mononucleotide
  – pterins
  – aminopterin
  – methotrexate
  – biopterin
  – neopterin
  – folic acid
  – pteroylpolyglutamic acids
  – tetrahydrofolates
  – formyltetrahydrofolates
  – leucovorin
  – xanthopterin
  – triamterene

– purines
  – adenine
  – 2-aminopurine
  – cytokinins
  – isopentenyladenosine
  – kinetin
  – zeatin
  – allopurinol
  – 6-mercaptopurine
  – azathioprine
  – purinones
  – hypoxanthines
  – guanine
  – acyclovir
  – ganciclovir
  – azaguanine
  – hypoxanthine
  – xanthines
  – caffeine
  – theobromine
  – pentoxifylline
  – theophylline
  – aminophylline
  – dimenhydrinate
  – dyphylline
  – 1-methyl-3-isobutylxanthine
  – xanthinol niacinate
  – uric acid
  – xanthine
  – saxitoxin
  – thioguanine

– pyrrolizidine alkaloids
  – monocrotaline

– quinazolines
  – ketanserin
  – methaqualone
  – metolazone
  – prazosin
  – doxazosin
  – tetrodotoxin
  – trimetrexate

– quinolines
  – aminoquinolines
  – amodiaquine
  – chloroquine
  – hydroxychloroquine
  – 4-hydroxyaminoquinoline-1-oxide
  – primaquine
  – dibucaine
  – ethoxyquin
  – hydroxyquinolines
  – decoquinate
  – kynurenic acid
  – oxamniquine
  – oxyquinoline
  – chloroquinolinols
  – chlorquinaldol
  – clioquinol
  – iodoquinol
  – procaterol
  – mefloquine
  – nitroquinolines
  – 4-nitroquinoline-1-oxide
  – oxamniquine
  – pyrroloiminoquinones
  – quinaldines
  – quinidine
  – quinine
  – quinolinium compounds
  – dequalinium
  – pyrvinium compounds
  – quinolones
  – 4-quinolones
  – nalidixic acid
  – nedocromil
  – oxolinic acid
  – carteolol
  – fluoroquinolones
  – ciprofloxacin
  – fleroxacin
  – enoxacin
  – norfloxacin
  – ofloxacin
  – pefloxacin
  – pqq cofactor
  – quinpirole
  – quipazine
  – saquinavir

– quinolizines
  – 2h-benzo(a)quinolizin-2-ol, 2-ethyl-1,3,4,6,7,11b-hexahydro-3-isobutyl-9,10-dimethoxy-
  – sparteine
  – tetrabenazine

– quinoxalines
  – carbadox
  – 6-cyano-7-nitroquinoxaline-2,3-dione
  – echinomycin
  – tyrphostins

– heterocyclic compounds, 3-ring

– acridines
  – acronine
  – aminoacridines
  – acridine orange
  – acriflavine
  – aminacrine
  – amsacrine
  – ethacridine
  – nitracrine
  – proflavine
  – quinacrine
  – quinacrine mustard
  – tacrine

– anthramycin

– carbazoles
  – ellipticines
  – ondansetron
  – staurosporine

– carbolines
  – harmaline
  – harmine

– cinoxacin

– dactinomycin

– dibenzazepines
  – carbamazepine
  – clomipramine
  – clozapine
  – desipramine
  – imipramine
  – lofepramine
  – mianserin
  – opipramol
  – trimipramine

– dibenzothiazepines

– dibenzothiepins
  – dothiepin
  – methiothepin

– dibenzoxazepines
  – dibenz(b,f)(1,4)oxazepine-10(11h)-carboxylic acid, 8-chloro-, 2-acetylhydrazide
  – loxapine
  – amoxapine

– dibenzoxepins
  – doxepin

– flavins
  – riboflavin
  – flavin-adenine dinucleotide
  – flavin mononucleotide

– phenanthridines
  – ethidium
  – propidium

– phenanthrolines

– phenazines
  – clofazimine
  – methylphenazonium methosulfate
  – neutral red
  – pyocyanine

– phenothiazines
  – acepromazine
  – azure stains
  – chlorpromazine
  – fluphenazine
  – mesoridazine
  – methotrimeprazine
  – methylene blue
  – moricizine
  – nonachlazine
  – perazine
  – perphenazine
  – prochlorperazine
  – promazine
  – promethazine
  – thiethylperazine
  – thioridazine
  – tolonium chloride
  – trifluoperazine
  – triflupromazine
  – trimeprazine

– psoralens
  – ficusin
  – khellin
  – methoxsalen
  – trioxsalen

– quinpirole

– spectinomycin

– xanthenes
  – fluoresceins
  – eosine i bluish
  – eosine yellowish-(ys)
  – erythrosine
  – fluorescein
  – fluorescein-5-isothiocyanate
  – rose bengal
  – propantheline
  – pyronine
  – rhodamines
  – rhodamine 123
  – thioxanthenes
  – chlorprothixene
  – clopenthixol
  – flupenthixol
  – hycanthone
  – lucanthone
  – thiothixene
  – xanthones
  – lucanthone
  – sterigmatocystin

– heterocyclic compounds with 4 or more rings

– aporphines
  – apomorphine

– berberine alkaloids
  – berberine

– cevanes
  – germine acetates
  – protoveratrines
  – veratrine
  – veratridine

– dihydro-beta-erythroidine

– ergolines
  – bromocriptine
  – ergonovine
  – methylergonovine
  – lisuride
  – lysergic acid
  – lysergic acid diethylamide
  – metergoline
  – methysergide
  – nicergoline
  – pergolide

– ergotamines
  – bromocriptine
  – dihydroergocornine
  – dihydroergocristine
  – dihydroergocryptine
  – dihydroergotamine
  – dihydroergotoxine
  – ergoloid mesylates
  – ergotamine

– harringtonines

– morphinans
  – buprenorphine
  – butorphanol
  – dextrorphan
  – diprenorphine
  – etorphine
  – levallorphan
  – levorphanol
  – dextromethorphan
  – morphine
  – morphine derivatives
  – codeine
  – hydrocodone
  – oxycodone
  – dihydromorphine
  – ethylmorphine
  – heroin
  – hydromorphone
  – oxymorphone
  – thebaine
  – nalbuphine
  – nalorphine
  – naloxone
  – naltrexone

– pterocarpans

– rifamycins
  – rifabutin
  – streptovaricin
  – rifampin

– rotenone

– tetrapyrroles
  – bile pigments
  – bilirubin
  – biliverdine
  – urobilin
  – urobilinogen
  – chlorophyll
  – bacteriochlorophylls
  – chlorophyllides
  – pheophytins
  – protochlorophyllide
  – corrinoids
  – vitamin b 12
  – cobamides
  – hydroxocobalamin
  – porphyrins
  – coproporphyrins
  – deuteroporphyrins
  – etioporphyrins
  – hematoporphyrins
  – hematoporphyrin derivative
  – dihematoporphyrin ether
  – mesoporphyrins
  – metalloporphyrins
  – chlorophyll
  – bacteriochlorophylls
  – chlorophyllides
  – protochlorophyllide
  – heme
  – hemin
  – porphyrinogens
  – coproporphyrinogens
  – uroporphyrinogens
  – protoporphyrins
  – uroporphyrins

– heterocyclic compounds, bridged-ring

– bicyclo compounds, heterocyclic
  – penicillins
  – amdinocillin
  – amdinocillin pivoxil
  – cyclacillin
  – methicillin
  – nafcillin
  – oxacillin
  – cloxacillin
  – dicloxacillin
  – floxacillin
  – penicillanic acid
  – penicillin g
  – ampicillin
  – amoxicillin
  – amoxicillin-potassium clavulanate combination
  – azlocillin
  – mezlocillin
  – piperacillin
  – pivampicillin
  – talampicillin
  – carbenicillin
  – carfecillin
  – penicillin g, benzathine
  – penicillin g, procaine
  – sulbenicillin
  – penicillin v
  – sulbactam
  – ticarcillin
  – ramipril

– cyclazocine
  – ethylketocyclazocine

– morphinans
  – buprenorphine
  – butorphanol
  – dextrorphan
  – diprenorphine
  – etorphine
  – levallorphan
  – levorphanol
  – dextromethorphan
  – morphine
  – morphine derivatives
  – codeine
  – hydrocodone
  – oxycodone
  – dihydromorphine
  – ethylmorphine
  – heroin
  – hydromorphone
  – oxymorphone
  – thebaine
  – nalbuphine
  – nalorphine
  – naloxone
  – naltrexone

– quinuclidines
  – quinidine
  – quinine
  – quinuclidinyl benzilate

– tropanes
  – atropine
  – atropine derivatives
  – ipratropium
  – benztropine
  – cocaine
  – crack cocaine
  – nortropanes
  – scopolamine
  – scopolamine derivatives
  – butylscopolammonium bromide
  – n-methylscopolamine

– heterocyclic oxides

– cyclic n-oxides
  – 4-hydroxyaminoquinoline-1-oxide
  – 4-nitroquinoline-1-oxide
  – triacetoneamine-n-oxyl

– cyclic p-oxides

– cyclic s-oxides

– pyrans

– aurovertins

– benzopyrans
  – aflatoxins
  – aflatoxin b1
  – aflatoxin m1
  – chromans
  – catechin
  – centchroman
  – chromones
  – cromolyn sodium
  – flavonoids
  – anthocyanins
  – benzoflavones
  – beta-naphthoflavone
  – biflavonoids
  – catechin
  – chalcones
  – chalcone
  – flavanones
  – hesperidin
  – flavones
  – apigenin
  – diosmin
  – flavoxate
  – luteolin
  – flavonolignans
  – silymarin
  – flavonols
  – kaempferols
  – quercetin
  – rutin
  – hydroxyethylrutoside
  – isoflavones
  – coumestrol
  – genistein
  – pterocarpans
  – rotenone
  – proanthocyanidins
  – citrinin
  – coumarins
  – aminocoumarins
  – novobiocin
  – chromonar
  – coumestrol
  – esculin
  – 4-hydroxycoumarins
  – acenocoumarol
  – dicumarol
  – ethyl biscoumacetate
  – phenprocoumon
  – warfarin
  – isocoumarins
  – ochratoxins
  – psoralens
  – ficusin
  – khellin
  – methoxsalen
  – trioxsalen
  – pyranocoumarins
  – umbelliferones
  – coumaphos
  – hymecromone
  – scopoletin
  – cromakalim
  – ellagic acid
  – hematoxylin
  – vitamin e
  – tocopherols
  – alpha-tocopherol
  – beta-tocopherol
  – gamma-tocopherol
  – tocotrienols

– glaucarubin

– iridoids

– nigericin

– patulin

– pyran copolymer

– pyranocoumarins

– pyrones

The list continues at List of MeSH codes (D04).

D03